Heworth ARLFC is an amateur rugby league football club based in Heworth, York. The first team plays in the NCL Division one.

In 1986, the club was one of ten founder members of the BARLA National Amateur League (now known as the National Conference League), and were the winners of the inaugural 1986–87 season.

Heworth has produced many players who went on to play the game professionally, most notably former internationals Geoff Wriglesworth, Kenneth Bowman, Colin Forsyth, David Watkinson and Gary Divorty.

The club went into decline following their success in the early years of the league, and in 2012 were demoted to NCL Division Three after failing to fulfill one of their fixtures. In 2015, the club withdrew from the National Conference League altogether due to a lack of playing strength. The club returned to the National Conference League in 2019.

Honours
 National Conference League Premier Division
 Winners (1): 1986–87
 National Conference League Division One
 Winners (1): 1993–94
 BARLA Yorkshire Cup
 Winners (1): 1993–94

References

External links
Club website
Club information on NCL website

BARLA teams
Sport in York
Rugby clubs established in 1922
1922 establishments in England
Rugby league teams in North Yorkshire
English rugby league teams